Crematogaster adrepens is a species of ant in tribe Crematogastrini. It was described by Forel in 1897.

References

adrepens
Insects described in 1897